The 2011 UCI Track Cycling World Championships was the World Championships for track cycling in 2011. The championships took place at the Omnisport Apeldoorn in Apeldoorn, Netherlands from 23 to 27 March 2011. In January 2012 it was announced that Grégory Baugé's results in the Sprint and Team Sprint competitions would be nullified.

The championships were dominated by the rivalry between Australia and Great Britain, who shared 10 of the 19 gold medals available between them, including in eight of the ten Olympic events.

Participating nations

41 nations participated.

  (2)
  (19)
  (3)
  (11)
  (4)
  (9)
  (6)
  (11)
  (12)
  (3)
  (9)
  (5)
  (14)
  (17)
  (16)
  (23)
  (9)
  (8)
  (2)
  (11)
  (9)
  (1)
  (3)
  (7)
  (5)
  (2)
  (21)
  (16)
  (10)
  (1)
  (21)
  (1)
  (8)
  (1)
  (3)
  (1)
 
  (10)
  (9)
  (2)
  (5)

Medal summary

Medal table

  were stripped of two gold medals in January 2012, following the suspension of Grégory Baugé for doping test availability violations, and the medals in those two events were redistributed by UCI.

See also

 2010–11 UCI Track Cycling World Ranking
 2010–11 UCI Track Cycling World Cup Classics

Notes

References

External links
Results book
Official event website

 
UCI Track Cycling World Championships
UCI Track Cycling World Championships
UCI Track Cycling World Championships by year
March 2011 sports events in Europe